Presidential elections were held in Peru in 1894. Andrés Avelino Cáceres of the Constitutional Party was elected unopposed.

Results

References

Presidential elections in Peru
Peru
1894 in Peru
Election and referendum articles with incomplete results